This is a summary of the electoral history of Sir Thomas Wilford, Mayor of Wellington (1910–11), Leader of the Liberal Party (1920–25) and Member of Parliament for Wellington Suburbs (1896–97, 1899-1902), then Hutt (1902–29).

Parliamentary elections

1893 election

1896 election

1899 election

1902 election

1905 election

1908 election

1911 election

1914 election

1919 election

1922 election

1925 election

1928 election

Local elections

Wellington City mayoral election, 1901

Wellington City mayoral election, 1907

Wellington City mayoral election, 1909

Wellington City mayoral election, 1910

Wellington City mayoral election, 1911

References

Bibliography

Wilford, Thomas